Kristina Besman (born 13 February 1996) is a Belarusian-born Azerbaijani volleyball player for Tulitsa Tula and the Azerbaijani national team.

She participated at the 2017 Women's European Volleyball Championship.

References

1996 births
Living people
Belarusian women's volleyball players
Azerbaijani women's volleyball players
Belarusian emigrants to Azerbaijan
Naturalized citizens of Azerbaijan
Setters (volleyball)
Volleyball players at the 2015 European Games
European Games competitors for Azerbaijan